WCCE (90.1 FM; "His Radio") is a radio station broadcasting a contemporary Christian format. Licensed to Buies Creek, North Carolina, United States, the station serves the Fayetteville area.  The station is owned by Radio Training Network and is a full-time satellite of WRTP in Franklinton.

Geographic coverage 
WCCE's 15,000 watt signal covers all of Harnett and Cumberland counties as well as parts of Wake, Lee, Johnston and Sampson counties.

Former programming 
The station had previously been the student radio station of Campbell University in Buies Creek.  It formerly aired a format featuring easy listening music during parts of the broadcast day along with religious programming; during this period, WCCE was branded as "Light and Easy 90.1".  This format was featured during the 1990s and early 2000s before being dropped in 2006 in favor of a Christian music format mixed with other religious programming.  It also aired various athletic events of the Campbell Fighting Camels.  Weekend programming included some bluegrass and big band music shows.

Sale 
Following the 2006–2007 school year, Campbell sold WCCE to Radio Training Network, which turned it into a full-power satellite of WRTP.  The call letters remain unchanged, even though the new station operates from studios located in North Raleigh. RTN took over the station's operations under a local marketing agreement until the sale closed in 2007.

Soon after taking over the station, RTN won FCC approval to increase WCCE's power to 15,000 watts from a new tower in northeastern Cumberland County.

Notes

External links 
 

CCE
Harnett County, North Carolina
CCE
CCE
Radio stations established in 1974